Eugène Amédée Aubry (born 15 May 1850, date of death unknown) was a French sports shooter. He competed in the men's trap event at the 1900 Summer Olympics.

References

External links
 

1850 births
Year of death missing
French male sport shooters
Olympic shooters of France
Shooters at the 1900 Summer Olympics
Sportspeople from Épinay-sur-Seine